The House on the Dune (French: La maison dans la dune) is a 1952 French crime drama film directed by Georges Lampin and starring Ginette Leclerc, Jean Chevrier and Roger Pigaut. It was a remake of the 1934 film of the same title, which was in turn based on the 1932 novel The House on the Dune by Maxence Van Der Meersch. The film's sets were designed by the art director Maurice Colasson.

Synopsis
Close to the Belgian border, smuggler Sylvain and his lover Germaine give shelter to Sylvain's friend and fellow smuggler César who has killed a customs officer. The dogged Inspector Lourges is placed on the case, although he begins to develop feelings for Germaine.

Cast

References

Bibliography 
 Philippe Rège. Encyclopedia of French Film Directors, Volume 1. Scarecrow Press, 2009.

External links 
 

1952 films
1952 drama films
French drama films
1952 crime films
French crime films
1950s French-language films
Films directed by Georges Lampin
Remakes of French films
French black-and-white films
1950s French films
Films based on French novels